Igor Leonidovych Dushyn was a candidate in the 2004 Ukrainian presidential election, nominated by the Liberal Democratic Party. From 1994 to 1998 he was chair of the secretariat of advisers of the President of Ukraine in the area of regional politics. From 1998 to 1999 he was a scientific consultant of the charitable organization Sodruzhestvo ("Concord"). From 1999 to 2000 he was a chair of Center of Business collaboration at the Fund of Assistance for Local Governments of Ukraine. 

Dushyn favors acknowledging the Russian language as a second official language in Ukraine, and also speaks in support of transforming Ukraine into a federal republic and the creation of a two-chamber parliament.

References

Year of birth missing (living people)
Living people
Liberal Party of Ukraine politicians
Candidates in the 2004 Ukrainian presidential election
National University of Kharkiv alumni